Ellen Gates D'Oench (2 October 1930 – 22 May 2009), known as "Puffin", was Curator Emerita of the Davison Art Center at Wesleyan University, Connecticut. A Wesleyan graduate magna cum laude, she curated the Davison Art Center from 1979 until 1998.

Biography
Ellen Gates D'Oench was born 2 October 1930.
D'Oench became an expert on the art of Arthur Devis on whom she completed her PhD dissertation at Yale University under the title "Arthur Devis: Master of the Georgian Conversation Piece". In 2011, an exhibition was held at the Davison Art Center titled "Collecting Photographs: Ellen G. D’Oench and the Growth of the Collection". She also wrote about and catalogued the work of Robert F. Sheehan's color photography.

She was the daughter of Elenita Crenshaw Gates, who married John Montheith Gates, and second husband Arthur Houghton. Both husbands were involved with Steuben Glassworks NYC. She married Russell Grace ( Derry ) D'Oench a great great grandson of W.R. Grace, who had the Grace shipping lines in NYC. Her oldest son Peter Gilchrist D'Oench, who she graduated Wesleyan with, became a TV news reporter in Miami and married an Oppenheimer. She was survive by sons Peter, wife Connie 3 daughters, 2 grand daughters, and Russell Grace ( Toby ) D'Oench, wife Tani Takagi, granddaughter and grand son, and daughter Ellen D'Oench ( Dodie ) Ruimerman, previously a daughter Jennifer, who died at a young age.

Selected publications
The conversation piece: Arthur Devis and his contemporaries. Yale University Press, New Haven, 1980. 
Copper into gold: Prints by John Raphael Smith. Yale University Press, New Haven, 1999. 
"Arthur Devis" in Oxford Dictionary of National Biography, Oxford University Press, Oxford.

References

External links
Ellen "Puffin" Gates D'Oench

1930 births
2009 deaths
American art historians
Women art historians
Wesleyan University faculty
Wesleyan University alumni
Yale University alumni
People from New York (state)